General Maharaj Shri Rajendrasinhji Jadeja  (15 June 1899 – 1 January 1964), also known as  K.S. Rajendrasinhji, was the first Chief of Army Staff of the Indian army, and the second Indian, after Field Marshal K. M. Cariappa, to become Commander-in-Chief of the Indian Army.

Personal life
Rajendrasinhji was born on 15 June 1899, at Sarodar in the Kathiawar region of what is now the western Indian state of Gujarat. The family belonged to the ruling Yaduvanshi Rajput dynasty of Nawanagar State (now Jamnagar), K.S. Ranjitsinhji, uncle of K.S.Duleepsinhji, two cricketing luminaries produced by that family. In 1928, Rajendrasinh wed Maya Kunwarba. The couple became the parents of three children. His son, Sukhdevsinhji, married the daughter of the ruler of Masuda, Rajkumari Vijaylakshmi Masuda. His youngest daughter was married to the Raja Sahib of the erstwhile princely state of Khairagarh in then Madhya Pradesh (present day Chhattisgarh), she was an MP of the Lok Sabha and a popular leader in her constituency.

Career
Rajendrasinhji attended Rajkumar College, Rajkot, then at Malvern College. Having resolved upon pursuing a military career, he joined the Royal Military College, Sandhurst. In 1921, he was commissioned as a Second lieutenant onto the Unattached List for the Indian Army. He spent a year attached to the 3rd battalion the King's Royal Rifle Corps and then joined the Indian Army and was posted to the 2nd Royal Lancers. As a King's Commissioned Indian Officer, he held various ranks and offices in the British Indian Army and served with distinction during the Second World War.

General Rajendrasinhji became the first Indian to be deputed to serve as Military Attaché to Washington DC in 1945–46.

Second World War
In 1941, Rajendrasinhji was sent to the Mediterranean and Middle East Theatre as a squadron commander of the 2nd Lancers. In April 1941, his brigade, the 3rd Indian Motor Brigade, was surrounded at Mechili by numerically superior Axis forces. Being encircled, the allied forces were left with no option but to hazard a headlong foray through the enemy forces, into the desert. Rajendrasinhji's squadron took the rearguard position during this operation. While the vanguard suffered much loss of life by a German tank attack, Ranjitsinhji's squadron was not seriously impacted. He led his squadron in a charge through the enemy ranks, and they gained respite in the safety of some nearby hills. The squadron essayed further action on the enemy forces after nightfall and achieved considerable success; indeed, it returned to base with sixty prisoners of war.

For his courageous leadership and determined action, Rajendrasinhji was awarded the Distinguished Service Order (DSO) in 1941. He was the first Indian to be honoured with this decoration during the Second World War.

Returning to India in October 1942, Rajendrasinhji was appointed commandant of 2 Royal Lancers in 1943. In May 1945, he was appointed the army's Deputy Director of Public Relations and posted to Washington, with a further appointment as military attache there from June. He was promoted to brigadier in September 1946 and assigned to command the Piska sub-area. He was then appointed the first Indian director of the Indian Armoured Corps, and shortly before Independence was promoted acting Major General on 30 July 1947.

In India
The Partition of India in 1947 caused an upheaval in both the security situation and the dynamics of the Indian army. The partition meant the division of the Indian army, which was concurrently called upon to deal with several critical security situations arising from the partition of the country and the anticipated integration of the princely states. Also during this period, British officers who held most of the senior ranks in the Indian army were gradually disengaged, being replaced with Indian officers. During this critical period, Rajendrasinhji was called upon to shoulder many onerous responsibilities and received rapid promotion in rank commensurately. As a new major-general, he was appointed to command the Delhi sub-area after Independence in August 1947, serving until 1948 as General Officer Commanding (GOC) of the redesignated Delhi and East Punjab Command (1947–48). He was promoted acting Lieutenant General on 16 January 1948 and appointed GOC-in-C Eastern Command. He was then appointed GOC-in-C Southern Command (1948–53), following the retirement of Lt. General E. N. Goddard. Operation Polo, which resulted in the integration of Hyderabad State with India, was executed during his term in office as GOC-in-C (South).

As the senior-most serving officer in the army, Gen. Rajendrasinhji was appointed Commander-in-Chief, Indian Army on 14 January 1953, following the retirement of General (later Field Marshal) K. M. Cariappa. Rajendrasinhji received the rank of General on the same day. With effect from 1 April 1955, the President of India was constitutionally designated the Commander-in-chief of the Indian Armed Forces. Rajendrasinhji then became the first head of the Indian army to be designated Chief of Army Staff. He held that office until his retirement from service on 14 May 1955 and was succeeded by Gen. S.M. Srinagesh.

Death 
General Maharaj Shri Rajendrasinhji died on 1 January 1964, aged 65 years.

Awards and decorations

Others
Order of Yugoslavia Army Class I

Dates of rank

Notes

References

 Who was the first Indian Chief of Army Staff of the Indian Army ?
  First Indian Chief of Army Staff ?

Bibliography

External links 
Profile on the website of the Indian Army
Offer of supecession? Another such suggestion

Dates as head of the army
List of Rajputs

1899 births
1964 deaths
Chiefs of Army Staff (India)
British Indian Army officers
Indian Army personnel of World War II
Companions of the Distinguished Service Order
Officers of the Legion of Merit
People from Gujarat
Graduates of the Royal Military College, Sandhurst
People from Jamnagar
Indian royalty
Indian Hindus
People educated at Malvern College
Indian generals
Indian Companions of the Distinguished Service Order
Indian military attachés